Micco is an unincorporated community in Logan County, West Virginia, United States. It is included in the Switzer census-designated place.

The community is named for Main Island Creek Coal Company (MICCO).

References

Unincorporated communities in Logan County, West Virginia
Unincorporated communities in West Virginia